The Chennai Suburban Railway is a commuter rail system in the city of Chennai, Tamil Nadu, India, operated by the Southern Railways branch of Indian Railways. It is the second largest suburban rail network in terms of route length and the third largest in terms of commuters in India. Around 1,000 services are operated daily between 4:00 a.m. and midnight.

Chennai has a complex railway network. It is the third busiest suburban rail system in India after Mumbai and Kolkata. It has separate tracks for local and express trains. The system uses electrical multiple units (EMUs) operating on alternating current (AC) drawn from overhead wires through the catenary system. As of 2013, the suburban sector has 1,000 services, including 250 in the Beach–Chengalpattu section, 240 services in the Chennai Central–Arakkonam section, and 90 in the Chennai Central–Gummidipoondi. As of 2020, 2.5 million people use the suburban train services daily and 401.72 million passenger every year. This includes 8,20,000 in the Beach–Tambaram section, 5,50,000 in the Central–Pattabhiram section, and 2,00,000 in the Central–Gummidipoondi section and 2,00,000 in the MRTS section. This is a 13.2 percent increase over the previous year. A total of 65 stations in the suburban section have bicycle stands.

History

Chennai has a fairly extensive suburban electric multiple unit (EMU) service. It was in the 1920s that the then British government felt the necessity of connecting the northern part of the city, which was mainly commercial, with the chiefly residential southwestern parts. In 1928, work began on constructing two meter gauge (MG) lines connecting the harbour with the southern suburb of Tambaram to run services using steam locomotives. In early 1930, however, the government decided to electrify the lines, including the mainline starting from Egmore. The plan to electrify railway lines in Madras was first initiated in 1923 by Sir Percy Rothera, an agent of the South Indian Railways. This was on account of the city's rapid expansion, with largely agricultural areas such as Saidapet, St. Thomas Mount and Tambaram developing into residential quarters. Plan to build a new line between Beach and Egmore and two lines between Egmore and Tambaram was announced as part of the suburban remodelling initiative of South Indian Railways. The rolling stock, consisting of rigid wooden-bodied coaches, were built by Metro-Cammell. On 27 December 1930, the first consignment of 25 electric carriages from England was received by the railway. The trains were painted in dull green with a black wheel base and featured wide sliding doors, a better-designed seating arrangement, and thick glass fronts. The new carriages were parked in Tambaram station. By March 1931, the construction works were completed, and the first electrically operated rail service in Madras began on 2 April 1931 between Madras Beach and Tambaram, which became the earliest metre gauge to be electrified in the country. It was launched by Sir George Fredrick Stanley, the then governor of Madras, who at the opening ceremony was reported to have said that the new train services would transform "desolate south Madras into burgeoning garden cities".

However, the suburban services were opened to the public only a month later on 11 May 1931. The section was electrified on 15 November 1931, with the first MG EMU services running on 1.5 kV DC. The Madras Electricity Supply Corporation, which powered the railway lines, was aided by sub-stations in Egmore and Meenambakkam. Soon, the number of trains shuttling passengers was increased to 45 a day, running every 10 minutes at peak hours, and every 30 minutes, otherwise. The running time between Madras Beach and Tambaram stations, which was 2 hours until then, was reduced to 49 minutes. The train service was made available from 4:00 in the morning up to 12:00 at night.

In the same year, mainline DC locomotives (YCG) were introduced to haul freight from the port. The system had the meter-gauge (MG) EMUs (YAU series) until the gauge conversion. Since then, the system has only the broad-gauge (BG) EMUs running.

In the 1960s, the line from Madras Beach to Villupuram was converted to 25 kV AC traction. This began with the conversion of the Madras Beach–Tambaram section on 15 January 1967. The rolling stock was changed to EMUs with motors and electricals from Toshiba or Hitachi. These were built by the Integral Coach Factory based in the city. Services too were extended to Chengleput with two daily services. In the late 1967, a Toshiba/Hitachi/Mitsubishi combine model YAM-1 21904 locomotive was introduced, which became the first MG 25 kV AC locomotive. Work on additional MG track between Tambaram and Chengleput began in 1969 and was completed in January 1971.

In 1985, suburban services to northern and western parts of the city began from the newly built Moore market terminal exclusively built for suburban services, which were earlier operating from the central station terminal (First BG Suburban Services in Chennai). With the growth in suburban traffic and the existing gauge lacking sufficient carrying capacity, the Indian Railway decided to convert the entire section between Beach and Tambaram, which by then had three MG lines, to BG in early 1991, with a 50:50 joint venture with the state government. The first BG line was laid in the section in 1992 parallel to the existing MG lines. The work was completed in February 1993. Of the three existing MG lines, two were exclusively used for suburban service and the third one was used for mainline express and passenger trains. The newly laid BG line started handling suburban trains supplementing the MG suburban lines.

In 1998, further to the Chengleput–Villupuram–Tiruchirapalli gauge conversion project, the railway decided to convert one of the MG lines in the section between Tambaram and Chengleput. However, the decision was soon changed due to large-scale protests by suburban commuters. This resulted in the conversion of the 'down' MG line (the easternmost line out of Tambaram) to BG, in addition to laying of a new parallel MG line. Within a year, work on the new BG was completed. By late 1999, there were two MG lines and one BG line between Tambaram and Chengleput, and the new BG line was electrified by late 2000. The conversion of the mainline MG line between Egmore and Tambaram began in 2000, resulting in Tambaram station temporarily acting as terminal point for mainline express and passenger trains originally originating from and terminating at Egmore. This resulted in increase in traffic at Tambaram station, where two additional MG lines were built. In March 2001, the gauge conversion project in the Madras–Madurai section was completed and BG passenger services began, and the Beach–Tambaram section featured two MG and two BG lines. In December 2001, electrification work of the Chengleput–Villupuram BG line commenced. Gauge conversion work of two MG lines between Beach and Egmore began in December 2002 and was completed by February 2003. This resulted in increased BG EMU services between Beach and Tambaram and the MG services from Tambaram terminating at Egmore. The spur MG lines in the Beach–Washermanpet section were dismantled.

In February 2003, one of the MG lines between Tambaram and Chengalpet was taken up for conversion and was completed in December 2003, which was used for BG EMU services and by mainline express trains. This resulted in 2 BG lines and 1 MG line in the Tambaram–Chengleput section by the end of 2003. The last MG EMU services between the  Egmore–Tambaram section were run on 1 July 2004, marking the end of the regular service of the YAM-1 locomotives, and the gauge conversion work in this section began. All MG mainline trains were switched over to diesel traction.

On 1 November 2004, with the completion of the gauge-conversion work in this section, BG EMU services were inaugurated in the Beach-Chengalpattu Section with the addition of 15 new rakes from ICF.

In September 2020, the conversion of the third meter-gauge line between Singaperumal Koil and Guduvancherry on the Tambaram–Chengalpattu stretch to broad gauge was completed and opened for traffic.

In February 2021, with the opening of 4 lines between Chennai Beach and Attipattu at a cost of  2.9 billion, all the eight routes in the Chennai section have 4 lines each.

Lines 

Fundamentally, Chennai has four suburban railway lines, namely, North line, West line, South line and the MRTS line. The South West line, West North line and West South line are merely minor extensions or modifications of the aforementioned suburban lines. The MRTS is a suburban railway line that chiefly runs on an elevated track exclusively used for running local EMUs or suburban local trains. No express trains or passenger trains run on MRTS line.

North Line

This line runs from the city towards the North direction and hence the name.

Chennai city region Stations:Chennai Beach- Royapuram - Washermenpet- Chennai Central MMC – Basin Bridge – Korukkupet – Tondiarpet – Tondiarpet Yard – Tiruvottiyur – Wimco Nagar – Kathivakkam – Ennore – Athipattu Pudhunagar – Athipattu – Nandiambakkam.

Outside City regions stations

Minjur – Anupambattu – Ponneri – Kavaraipettai – Gummidipoondi    – Elavur – Arambakkam  – Tada (Andhra Pradesh) - Akkamapet – Sullurpeta

Few train services originate from Chennai Beach instead of Chennai Central. Trains originating from Chennai Beach pass through Royapuram, Washermanpet to reach Korukkupet. From Korukkupet the route is same as listed above.

 Suburban EMU services terminate at Sullurpeta (AP)
 MEMU service is up to Nellore
 Currently 83 train services run on the North Suburban line, whose split up is as follows
 37 services begin from Chennai Central towards Northern suburbs, while another 37 services originate from the Northern suburbs proceeding to Chennai Central
 Only 5 train services are run from Chennai Beach towards Northern suburbs, and there are 7 services in the return direction towards Chennai Beach
 This is the only route in India where a suburban train is operated outside the state.

South Line 
(Along GST Road from St. Thomas Mount to Chengalpattu)

Chennai city Region Stations: Chennai Beach – Chennai Fort – Chennai Park – Chennai Egmore – Chetpet – Nungambakkam – Kodambakkam – Mambalam – Saidapet – Guindy – St. Thomas Mount – Pazhavanthangal – Meenambakkam – Tirisulam – Pallavaram – Chromepet – Tambaram Sanatorium – Tambaram – Perungalathur – Vandalur.

Stations Outside Chennai City Regions below:

Urapakkam – Guduvancheri – Potheri – Kattangulathur – Maraimalai Nagar – Singaperumal Koil – Paranur – Chengalpattu – Reddipalayam - Villiambakkam – Palur – Palayaseevaram – Walajabad – Nathapettai – Kanchipuram – Tirumalpur- Takkolam- Arakkonam.
 Suburban electric trains on this route, terminate at Chengalpet station, in the south
 MEMU services proceed in the southern direction from Chengalpet on the line towards Villupuram.
 Circular train running between Chennai Beach to Chennai Beach - Via Tambaram, Chengalpattu,  Tirumalpur, Arakkonam, Tiruvallur and Perambur
 Currently 240 services are being run on the South Suburban line.
Important Stations on the South Line
 Chennai Beach – Terminal Station for all South and MRTS line trains and a few north and west line trains. Close to Chennai Port and Harbour
 Chennai Fort – Close to the commercial hub of Parry's Corner or Broadway.
 Chennai Park – Lies opposite Chennai Central which is a terminus for long distance and suburban trains. Also close to Park Town MRTS station.
 Chennai Egmore – Terminal Station for several long-distance trains.
 Mambalam – Lies in the commercial and textile hub of T. Nagar. Halt station for several long-distance express trains.
 Guindy – upcoming interchange with Mount Road metro Line. Close to Guindy Industrial Estate and bus terminus
 St Thomas Mount – upcoming interchange for 100 feet Road Metro Line and MRTS line.
 Tirisulam – Lies opposite Chennai International Airport
 Tambaram – A terminus for several local suburban trains and a halt for long-distance express trains. Tambaram is also the Southern Gateway of Chennai. Tambaram Railway Station is a 3rd terminal of Chennai city.
Paranur - Station which is near to Mahindra world city, home for more than 100 multinational companies including Infosys, Renault Nissan, Wipro and much more. Busiest station in Tambaram to Chengalpattu line.
 Chengalpet Junction – A junction with 3 lines and a halt station for long-distance express trains.

West Line 

Chennai Beach- Royapuram- Washermenpet- Chennai Central MMC – Basin Bridge – Vyasarpadi Jeeva – Perambur – Perambur Carriage Works – Perambur Loco Works – Villivakkam -Padi(Defunct) - Anna Nagar(Defunct)– Korattur – Pattaravakkam – Ambattur – Thirumullaivoyal – Annanur – Avadi – Hindu College – Pattabiram –Pattabiram Military Siding- pattabiram East depot- Nemilichery – Thiruninravur – Veppampattu – Sevvapet Road – Putlur – Tiruvallur – Egattur – Kadambattur – Senjipanambakkam - Manavur-Thiruvalangadu – Mosur – Puliyamangalam – Arakkonam Junction - Tiruttani
 Suburban EMU train services terminate at Tiruttani.
 However, MEMU services run up to Tirupathy, Vellore cantonment and Jolarpettai
Arakkonam Junction is the important terminus for other trains coming to chennai
 Few trains operate from Chennai Beach. These trains from Chennai Beach cover a distance of  via Royapuram and Washermanpet stations to reach Vysarpadi, beyond which the alignment is same as the trains from Chennai Central. Though most of the beach bound trains will operate from arakkonam via chengalpattu, tambaram line which is the southern line.
 There is a separate loop line which gets divided from Hindu college railway station just after crossing avadi railway station in the western line. It is called as pattabiram east depot railway station. Sub urban train available from this station till chennai central with a service frequency of one and half an hour.

MRTS line 

The MRTS line is an exclusive line of the Chennai suburban railway as it runs elevated for most of its section. Moreover, the route is unique as it is exclusively used to run suburban EMU trains. No express trains, MEMU trains or passenger trains ply on the MRTS route.

The MRTS currently runs from Chennai Beach to Velachery. However the MRTS line is being extended from Velachery to St Thomas Mount(as phase 2 extension), where it will intersect with the South line and Metro line (Koyambedu – St Thomas Mount). St Thomas Mount station will house South line suburban trains at grade level, MRTS trains at level 1 and Metro trains at level 2.

Between Chennai Beach till Park Town, the MRTS alignment runs parallel to the South Suburban line. Beyond this, the MRTS climbs up on a gradient to reach the Chindadripet station which is elevated. The alignment remains elevated till Perungudi beyond which it slopes down to reach the Velachery station which is at grade level. However, the under-construction line between Velachery to St. Thomas Mount will be elevated again. Stations in Chennai MRTS include Chennai Beach, Chennai Fort, Park Town, Chintadripet, Chepauk, Triplicane, Light House, Mundakanniamman Koil, Thirumayilai, Mandaveli, Greenways Road, Kottupuram, Kasturbai Nagar, Indira Nagar, Tiruvanmiyur, Taramani, Perungudi, Velachery, Puzhuthivakkam (under construction), Adambakkam (under construction), and St. Thomas Mount

Circular line 
At , the Chennai Suburban Railway has the longest circular rail route in India. The circular rail line was proposed in the CMDA SMP.

Stations on this route include Chennai Beach, Egmore, Tambaram, Chengalpattu Junction, Kanchipuram, Takkolam, Arakkonam Junction, Tiruvallur, Avadi, Ambattur, Vyasarpadi Jeeva, Washermanpet, Royapuram, and Chennai Beach.

After finishing the complete the last leg of electrification project Takkolam-Arakkonam stretch, Chennai Beach–Tambaram Chengalpattu–Kanchipuram–Arakkonam–Tiruvallur–Avadi- Royapuram -Chennai Beach became India's longest circular route.

The newly laid electrified line was inspected by the Commissioner of Railway Safety (CRS) on January 25, 2019,

The first train on the circular route ran on 23 April 2019.

Initially, two trains are being operated:
 MSB-MSB via MSB-AVD-TRL-AJJ- KPM-CGL-TBM-MSB 
 MSB-MSB via MSB-TBM-CGL-KPM-AJJ-TRL-AVD-MSB

Defunct lines
Villivakkam Junction–Anna Nagar West Railway line

This line is one of the two branch lines of the western line (the other one is Pattabiram east depot line, which is still operational) and gets divided from Villivakkam junction.

This is one of the two lines that ends within the Chennai city limits (the other one is the MRTS corridor, which is still operational).

Total length of this line from Villivakkam junction to Anna Nagar West railway station is 5 km. This line consist of two stations, namely,

 Padi railway station
 Anna Nagar West railway station

This railway line is owned by the ICF for testing its coaches and trail runs. Later it is converted to passenger traffic. This line started its service at 2003 from Chennai Beach to Anna Nagar West via Royapuram, Villivakkam, and Padi. But the train service have been with drawn at 2007 due to many reasons and never restored till date.

Some of the reasons are:

 The construction of the Padi flyover
 Heavy rail traffic as it has a single railway line only
 Poor patronage

Now this line is used by the ICF for trail runs and also used as a parking lots for empty rakes of express trains.

Current Services 

By 2006, the suburban system carried about 500,000 commuters daily, which rose to about 700,000 by 2009. By 2011, this has increased to 960,000 passengers a day.

As of 2006, 24 rakes, each with 9 cars, are operated every day between Tambaram and Chennai Beach, with a plan to increase the fleet to 30 rakes.

By the end of 2013, all the 9-unit EMU services in Chennai Beach–Tambaram–Chengalpattu section were expected to be converted into 12-unit services. With this the carrying capacity of the suburban services would be enhanced by another 25 percent.

As of 2017, a total of 1,180,000 passengers use the suburban services every day, including 400,000 in the Western route, 560,000 in the Southern route, 120,000 in the northern route, and 100,000 in the MRTS route.

West line
Chennai Central via Vysarpadi Junction and Ambattur DOWN (destined to any of Pattabiram, Avadi, Tiruvallur, Kadambattur Arakkonam, Tirutani):89 services of which there are only three fast suburban locals on this route.
 From any of these source terminal stations to Chennai Central UP: 91 services. Of this only four are fast trains.
 Chennai Beach via WST-Vysarpadi DOWN:24 services of which only one is a fast local.
 In Return to Chennai Beach UP: 25 services of which two are fast.
 Total for WEST Line = 229 services (towards suburbs = 113; towards MAS/MSB = 116)

South Line
 Chennai Beach via Egmore to TBM/CGL/TMLP/AJJ DOWN: 121 services (weekdays). Of this only four are fast trains
 South Line terminals to Chennai Beach UP:119 services (weekdays). Of this only eight are fast trains
 Total for SOUTH line = 240 services weekday (121 towards suburbs, 119 towards beach)

North Line
 Chennai Central via Korukkupet and beyond DOWN: 37 services
 Return direction to MAS UP: 37 services
 No differentiation w.r.t Sundays.
 No fast trains
 Chennai Beach via Royapuram, Washermanpet, Korukupet Junction and beyond DOWN: four train services only.
 Return direction to MSB UP: five train services only.
 Total for NORTH line = 83 services (41 towards suburbs, 42 towards MAS/MSB)

MRTS Line
 Chennai Beach to Velachery DOWN: 67 services (weekday)
 VLCY to MSB UP: 67 services (weekday)
 Total for MRTS line = 134 services weekday (67 in each direction)
 There are slow trains on the MRTS line too

Unusual services
 On Korukkupet-Vysarpadi Line: three (two inbound and one return)
 Ennore to Trivallur (without touching Basin Bridge Jn and MAS) via Korukkupet directly to Vysarpadi Jeeva
 Similarly there is a Ponneri to Tiruvallur (and reverse) Local train that doesn't touch Basin Bridge Junction.
. One daily service from Chennai beach to Chennai Central station in the evening only one way.

Interchange stations

New Lines
The following new lines have been proposed in the Second Master Plan by CMDA as a long-term Urban transportation Scheme
 Avadi – Sriperumbudur – Kanchipuram
 Saidapet – Sriperumbudur – Kanchipuram (Partly Elevated)
 Sriperumbudur – Oragadam – Chengalpattu
 Kelambakkam – Vandalur
 St.Thomas Mount – Porur
 Velachery - St. Thomas Mount (MRTS stretch presently under construction)

The railways also plan to lay a  Perungudi–Cuddalore railway line via Mahabalipuram.

Comprehensive Transportation Study
The following new lines have been proposed in the Comprehensive Transportation Study of the Chennai Metropolitan Development Authority. These lines will provide a circumferential travel network for the city.
 Perungudi – Sholinganallur -- Scrapped due to metro rail project
 Mamallapuram – Chengalpattu -- Pending
 Chengalpattu – Maduranthakam -- Considering extending some Chengalpattu bound EMUs to Maduranthakam
 Korattur – Sholinganallur-- Scrapped due to metro rail project

Fares and ticketing
Per the 2013 Railway Budget, the railway increased the Chennai suburban ticket fare by eight paise per kilometre, although the railway ministry has hiked it by two paise per kilometre. The number of fare schedules has also been reduced to four—,,  and —from the eight tables earlier.

In 2012 (January–December), the Chennai division of Southern Railway zone generated  through penalties imposed on ticketless and irregular travellers, which is marginally higher than  generated during the previous fiscal (April 2011–March 2012).

Rolling stock

The current Rolling stock is the Broad-gauge WAU-4 built in the Integral Coach Factory of Chennai, to replace the YAU-x (x=1, 2, 3, 4) series Meter Gauge EMUs that ran till 2004 (on the South Line; they were also built by the ICF), which in turn were made to replace wooden-bodied rakes built by the British manufacturer Metro-Cammell. Electrical equipment and motors were provided by the Japanese manufacturers Toshiba and Hitachi. They were originally delivered in a cream and brown livery though they have been modernised in recent years most notably the brown stripe has been changed to green and the front end design has changed on some trains as well as the addition of electronic destination displays. Like most suburban trains around India, they have manually-operated sliding doors which are often left open. As with most suburban railways around India, trains have designated women's cars and compartments. There have also been Women-only trains which run occasionally. Trains do not have gangways/vestibules between cars. Modernised versions of the WAU-4 stock also run on the Suburban Rail Systems of other notable cities like Mumbai, Delhi, Kolkata, Pune and Hyderabad

The Current WAU-4 Rolling Stock includes ICF Rakes, BEML Rakes and Siemens Rakes (MRVC Look-Alikes). However, newer 3-Phase Medha EMUs have also been introduced to ply along the routes.

Maintenance
The suburban network has EMU car sheds at Avadi, Tambaram and Velachery where maintenance of EMUs is done. Electrical loco sheds of the Southern Railway are located at Royapuram, Arakkonam and Erode where maintenance of electrical locomotives is done. It also has workshops at Perambur Carriage Works and Perambur Loco Works from where periodical overhauling of coaching stock is done. Periodical overhauling of electrical rolling stock is done at Perambur Loco Works and the EMU car sheds at Avadi and Tambaram.

Accidents and incidents

On 29 April 2009, a suburban EMU train from Chennai Central suburban terminal was hijacked by an unidentified man, who rammed it with a stationary goods train at Vyasarpadi Jeeva railway station, killing four passengers and injuring 11 others. A major portion of the platform at the station, a footbridge and the railway track were damaged by the collision. The train was scheduled to start at 5:15 am but started at 4:50 am by the perpetrator. The speed of the EMU train at the time of the collision was estimated to be . There were approximately 35 passengers on board at the time of the accident.

Accident rates
Of the entire stretch of the South line, the Guindy–Chengalpet suburban section, comprising 17 stations, suffers from more fatal accidents with about 30 people a month, peaking at the Chromepet–Tambaram stretch with at least 15 accidents a month as of 2011. Of the 181 people killed on the tracks between Guindy and Chengalpet in 2011, one-fourth were killed on the tracks between Chromepet and Tambaram stations. It is to be noted that almost all of these accidents took place at rail-road crossings. Measures are being taken to prevent these accidents. Several projects are already under way to convert all the rail-road crossings into Subways or overpasses.

Security
In 2013, seven important stations, including MGR Chennai Central, Chennai Egmore, Chennai Beach, Tambaram, Mambalam, Tiruvallur and Basin Bridge Junction, in the suburban section were brought under the Integrated Security System (ISS) of the Southern Railway.

See also
 Transport in Chennai
 Railway stations in Chennai
 Chennai MRTS
 Arakkonam Junction railway station

References

External links

 Suburban time table
 Suburban fare list
 Suburban train codes
 Suburban season ticket – fare list
 http://erail.in/ChennaiSubUrbanTrains.htm

 
Railway lines opened in 1931
Airport rail links in India
1931 establishments in India